Ace Electronic Industries Inc., or Ace Tone was a manufacturer of electronic musical instruments, including electronic organs, analogue drum machines, and electronic drums, as well as amplifiers and effects pedals. Founded in 1960 by Ikutaro Kakehashi with an investment by Sakata Shokai, Ace Tone can be considered an early incarnation of the Roland Corporation, which was also founded by Kakehashi. Ace Tone began manufacturing amplifiers in 1963.

History
Ikutaro Kakehashi began learning practical mechanical engineering as a teenager, and found there was a demand for electronics repair in Japan following the end of World War II. After recovering from tuberculosis in 1954, he opened a goods store in Osaka and began assembling and repairing radios. He attempted to build an electric organ in the late 1950s from spares, including parts of an old reed organ, telephones and electronic components, and started a business in 1960, initially making amplifiers. He subsequently designed an organ that was sold by Matsushita.

In 1964, Kakehashi designed his first hand playing electronic drum, the R1 Rhythm Ace, constructed from transistor circuitry. It was designed to be attached below the manuals on a home organ, and had six buttons that created a variety of percussion sounds. It was presented at that year's National Association of Music Merchants (NAMM). However, it lacked automatic accompaniment and so was unsuccessful.

In 1965, Ace Tone established a US distribution agreement with Sorkin. In 1967, the company introduced the Rhythm Ace FR-1, which allowed a variety of automatically-played popular rhythms with a variable tempo. It was commercially successful and led to partnership with the Hammond Organ Company, who added Ace Tone's rhythm units to its range of instruments. At the end of the 1960s, Ace Tone began manufacturing guitar effects boxes, such as fuzz which was modelled on an earlier Gibson model.

Products

Electronic Keyboards

Clavioline

Canary S-2 (1962) — Vacuum tube clavioline, exhibited on 1964 Summer NAMM, but not released.
Canary S-3 (Three legs) — Transistor clavioline

Combo Organ
TOP-1 (1968 or 1969)
TOP-3 (Phenix) (1965)
TOP-4 (Phenix) 
TOP-5 (c. 1969)
TOP-6 (c. 1972)
TOP-7
TOP-8
TOP-9 (1968 or 1969)
GT-2 (c. 1975) — predecessor of Hammond X-2 (c. 1978) and possibly Hammond B-100W (c. 1983)
GT-5 (c. 1971) — predecessor of Ace Tone X-3/X-3W (c. 1978) and possibly Hammond B-250W (c. 1983)
GT-7 (1971) — predecessor of Hammond X-5 (c. 1978) and Hammond B-200 (c. 1980).
X-3/X-3W (c. 1978) — although model name evokes Hammond X series, it was shipped under Ace Tone brand.
combo organ accessories
OR-30 Transistorized Bench Amplifier
PK-2 Organ Bass Pedals
Expander/Expression Pedal EXP-4
HP-10 Headphone (for combo organ)
HP-20 Headphone

Home Organ

TO-S1 (c. 1966)
A-122
B-422
B-5
C-422S
Ace 1000 / 2000 / 3000 (c. 1970s) — designed based on Hammond Cadette series. Ace 3000 has built-in cassette recorder on the lower right.

Organs (OEM)

National (Panasonic) SX-601 (1963)
Hammond VS-300 Cadette (1973–?) — although early Cadettes was built in Japan by Yamaha/Nippon Gakki, later models in the United Kingdom was built by Ace Tone/Nihon Hammond.
Hammond F 1000 / 2000 / 3000 (1970s) — these models built in England in the 1970s, were variations of Ace 1000 / 2000 / 3000 designed & built in Japan, based on Hammond Cadette series.

Electronic Piano
AP-100 Electronic Piano

Synthesizers
Multistrings SY-5
PS-1000 Monosynth (1975) — similar to Roland SH-3/SH-3A (1974)
SY-100 Monosynth

Effects
Analog Delay EH-50
Analog Delay EH-100
Echo Chamber EC-1
Reverb/Echo Chamber EC-10 Professional Echo
Echo Chamber EC-20
FUZZ/BOOSTER
Fuzz Master FM-1 (c. 1966–68)
Fuzz Master FM-2 (c. 1968–)
Fuzz Master FM-3 (c. 1971–)
Graphic Equalizer QH-100
Stereo Phasor LH-100
Twin Ace FW-1 (Fuzz + Wah)
Wah Master WM-1

Drum Machines

R1 Rhythm Ace (push-button electronic drum percussion) (1964)
Rhythm Ace R-3   (1966)
Rhythm Ace FR-1 (1967) [A][H]
Rhythm Ace FR-2L [A][H]
Auto Rhythm FR-2D	[S][H]
Rhythm Ace FR-3 (c. 1967) [A][H],[R]
Rhythm Ace FR-3S	[M]
Rhythm Ace FR-4	[M]
Rhythm Ace FR-6/FR-6P (c. 1972 or 1974)	[A][S]
Rhythm Ace FR-6M	[M]
Rhythm Ace FR-7M	
Rhythm Producer FR-7L	[R][H]
Rhythm Producer FR-8L [A][M]
Rhythm Ace FR-13	
Rhythm Producer FR-15 (1975) — partly programmable rhythm machine
Rhythm Ace FR-20 (Floor type)
Rhythm Ace FR-30 (Floor type)
Rhythm Ace FR-60 (Floor type)
Rhythm Ace FR-70 (Floor type)
Rhythm FEVER FR-106 [S]
Hammond Auto-Vari 64 (AV-64) [A][H]
Note: Rhythm Ace series were known to be shipped under multiple brands as follows:
Since 1967, Hammond Organ Company distributed Rhythm Ace under Hammond brand. 
[A][H] Ace Tone model also shipped from Hammond.
 Ace Tone FR-2L ⇒ Hammond Auto (1972)
 Ace Tone FR-3   ⇒ Hammond Rhythm 2
[R][H] Hammond shipped far improved model based on Roland's improved model.
 Ace Tone FR-7L ⇒ Roland Rhythm 77 (1972) ⇒ Hammond Auto-Vari 64 (1974)
[S][H] Hammond models manufactured by Nihon Hammond.
In the 1970s, possibly several models were also distributed under Multivox brand by Sorkin Music, an early general agent of Ace Tone in the United States.  On the other hand, late-1970s models such as Multivox FR-3 seem to share several similarities with Korg Minipops.
[M]     Multivox models
[A][M] Also shipped from Multivox
In the mid-1970s, "ACE TONE" brand was taken over by Sakata/Nihon Hammond.
[S]     Sakata/Nihhon Hammond models
[A][S] Also shipped from Sakata/Nihhon Hammond.
In 1972, Kakehashi left Ace Electronics and established Roland Corporation. 
[R]     Roland released improved models in 1972:
 Ace Tone FR-3L ⇒ Roland Rhythm 33 (1972, TR-33)
 Ace Tone FR-7L ⇒ Roland Rhythm 77 (1972, TR-77)

Amplifiers

Guitar Amplifiers
Mini Ace (Combo)
Mini-8 (Combo)
Solid Ace-1/SA-1 (Combo)
Solid Ace-2/SA-2 (Combo)
Solid Ace-3 (Head/Cab), SA-3 (Combo), SA-3C (Combo), SA-3D
Solid Ace-5/SA-5 (Combo)
Solid Ace-6/SA-6 (Head/Cab)
Solid Ace-7 (Combo)
Solid Ace-8/SA-8 (Head/Cab)
Solid Ace-9/SA-9 (Head)
Solid Ace-10/SA-10 (Head/Cab)
SA-15 (Combo)
SA-25 (Combo)
SA-45 (Combo)
SA-60 (Combo)
SA-120 (Head/Cab)
SA-150 (Head/Cab)
Friend Ace AR-1 (Combo)
Gut's Ace
GA-5S Cabinet
G-15 Guitar Amplifier (Combo) (1977)
G-35 (Combo)
G-50 (Combo)
GH-1 (Preamp + Mixer) (c. 1976)
GH-600/GH-600S (Combo/Powered Cab) (c. 1976)
GH-1200/GH-1200S (Combo/Powered Cab) (c.1976)
L35 (Combo)

Tube Amplifiers
A-10 Fighter
Mighty-5 (Head/Cab) — 50Watt
Rockey (Combo) — 15 Watt 1× 12"
Elite (Combo) — 4 Watt, 1× 8" (a.k.a. Model A-1R)
Duetto (Combo)
Model-101 (Combo) — 1× 8"
Model-201 (Combo)
Model-301 (Combo)
Model-601 (Head/Cab) (c. 1968)

Bass Amplifiers
Bass-3/B-3 (Combo) — Solid State
Bass-6/B-6 (Head/Cab) — Solid State
B-7 (Head/Cab)
Bass-9/B-9 (Head/Cab)
B-50 (Combo)
BH-1 (Preamp + Mixer)
BH-600S (Powered Cab)
BH-1200S (Powered Cab)

Vocal Amplifiers/Channel Mixer
VM-4 Solid State Channel Mixer (4ch Powered Mixer)
VM-6 (6ch Powered Mixer)
VM-30 (Combo)
SL-30 (Powered Cab for VM-30)
VM-45 (Combo)
VM-50/VS-50 (Powered Mixer/Cab)
Channel Mixer VM-80 Professional/VS-80 (6ch Powered Mixer/Cab)
VM-85/VS-85 (Powered Mixer/Cab)
VM-150/VS-150 (Powered Mixer/Cab)
VM-200 (Powered Mixer with Wireless Mic & Cab)
Echo Mixer MP-4 (4ch Mixer)
MP-40 (4ch Mixer)
PH-1 (Mixer)
PH-2 (Mixer)
PH-600S (Powered Cab)
PH-1200S (Powered Cab)

Speaker Systems
 BSP-6 — 2× 12" speakers
 SP-15 — 1× 15" Gold Bond speaker
 SP-30 — 2× 15" Gold Bond speakers
 SP-35 — 2× 15" extra massive speakers
 SP-45 — 3× 15" Gold Bond speakers
 SP-10 — 2× 15" + 2× 8" speakers
 SP-410 — 4× 15" speakers

Other
AD-171 Dynamic Microphone
AE-181 Electret Condencer Microphone
AD-191 Dynamic Microphone
AD-201 Dynamic Microphone
Mic Adapter MP-1 (2ch Mic Preamp)
Multi-Vox EX-100 (Wind Instrument Preamp)
Psyche Light PL-125
Tuning Gun AT-32 (Tuner)

See also
Multivox
Roland Corporation
The Dave Howard Singers, a band that popularized the sound of the Acetone Top 5

Notes

Media

References

Sources

Ace Tone & Nihon Hammond Catalogs:
 (for details, see PDF version)

 (excerpt)

 — a visit report on Roland Corporation Hamamatsu Laboratory where early Ace Tone products are also exhibited.Note: the production years seen on their private museum are not reliable. For example, production years of early product/prototype (Canary S-2 (1962), R-1 Rhythm Ace (1964)), and the later mass-production models (Canary S-3 (c. 1965), Rhythm Ace FR-1 (c. 1967)) are mysteriously confused.
 — List of products and some corporate history.
 — Profiles of organs and corporate history.
 
Harmony Central: Ace Tone: Reviews — Reviews of Ace Tone products. 
Orgel Wiki: Ace Tone — more pictures of organ models.
VintageSynth.hu: Ace — more pictures of products.

External links
ace-tone lh-100 stereo phasor – LH-100 Stereo Phasor photo and audio examples.
effectsdatabase.com: Ace Tone WM-1 Wah Master.

Musical instrument manufacturing companies of Japan
Synthesizer manufacturing companies of Japan